Socialist democracy is a political system that aligns with principles of both socialism and democracy. It includes ideologies such as council communism, democratic socialism, and Soviet democracy, as well as Marxist democracy like the dictatorship of the proletariat. It was embodied in the Soviet system (1917–1991). It can also denote a system of political party organization like democratic centralism, or a form of democracy espoused by Marxist–Leninist political parties or groups that support  one-party states. The Socialist Federal Republic of Yugoslavia (1945–1992) styled itself a socialist democracy, as did the People's Republic of Bulgaria (1946–1990) and the Socialist Republic of Romania (1947–1989).

Several parties or groups that tend to have a connection to the reunified Fourth International use this label. Parties include Socialist Democracy in Australia, Socialist Democracy in Brazil, Socialist Democracy in Ireland, the Socialist Democracy Group in England, Parti de la Democratie Socialiste in Canada, and the Socialist Democracy Party in Turkey.

The Chinese Communist Party (CCP) claims to maintain principles of socialist democracy. CCP Chairman Mao Zedong advocated the people's democratic dictatorship, which emphasizes the importance of dictatorship of the proletariat in the democratic process. In the reform and opening-up period, Deng Xiaoping said that that democracy is the essential element of socialism, as there will be no socialism and modernization without democracy. Under CCP General Secretary Xi Jinping, the CCP continues being a socialist democracy, under which the National People's Congress selects state leaders.

Views on compatibility of socialism and democracy

Support 
One of the major scholars who have argued that socialism and democracy are compatible is the Austrian-born American economist Joseph Schumpeter, who was hostile to socialism. In his book Capitalism, Socialism and Democracy (1942), Schumpeter emphasised that "political democracy was thoroughly compatible with socialism in its fullest sense", although it has been noted that he did not believe that democracy was a good political system and advocated republican values.

In a 1963 address to the All India Congress Committee, Indian Prime Minister Jawaharlal Nehru stated: "Political democracy has no meaning if it does not embrace economic democracy. And economic democracy is nothing but socialism." Political historian Theodore Draper wrote: "I know of no political group which has resisted totalitarianism in all its guises more steadfastly than democratic socialists." Historian and economist Robert Heilbroner argued that "[t]here is, of course, no conflict between such a socialism and freedom as we have described it; indeed, this conception of socialism is the very epitome of these freedoms", referring to open association of individuals in political and social life; the democratization and humanization of work; and the cultivation of personal talents and creativity.

Bayard Rustin, long-time member of the Socialist Party of America and National Chairman of the Social Democrats, USA, wrote: "For me, socialism has meaning only if it is democratic. Of the many claimants to socialism only one has a valid title—that socialism which views democracy as valuable per se, which stands for democracy unequivocally, and which continually modifies socialist ideas and programs in the light of democratic experience. This is the socialism of the labor, social-democratic, and socialist parties of Western Europe."

Economist and political theorist Kenneth Arrow argued: "We cannot be sure that the principles of democracy and socialism are compatible until we can observe a viable society following both principles. But there is no convincing evidence or reasoning which would argue that a democratic-socialist movement is inherently self-contradictory. Nor need we fear that gradual moves in the direction of increasing government intervention will lead to an irreversible move to 'serfdom.'" Journalist William Pfaff wrote: "It might be argued that socialism ineluctably breeds state bureaucracy, which then imposes its own kinds of restrictions upon individual liberties. This is what the Scandinavians complain about. But Italy's champion bureaucracy owes nothing to socialism. American bureaucracy grows as luxuriantly and behaves as officiously as any other."

Opposition 
Some politicians, economists, and theorists have argued that socialism and democracy are incompatible. According to them, history is full of instances of self-declared socialist states that at one point were committed to the values of personal liberty, freedom of speech, freedom of the press, and freedom of association but then found themselves clamping down on such freedoms as they end up being viewed as inconvenient or contrary towards their political or economic goals. Chicago School economist Milton Friedman argued that a "society which is socialist cannot also be democratic" in the sense of "guaranteeing individual freedom". Sociologist Robert Nisbet, a philosophical conservative who began his career as a leftist, argued in 1978 that there is "not a single free socialism to be found anywhere in the world."

Irving Kristol, a neoconservative journalist, argued: "Democratic socialism turns out to be an inherently unstable compound, a contradiction in terms. Every social democratic party, once in power, soon finds itself choosing, at one point after another, between the socialist society it aspires to and the liberal society that lathered it." Kristol added that "socialist movements end up [in] a society where liberty is the property of the state, and is (or is not) doled out to its citizens along with other contingent 'benefits'." Anti-communist academic Richard Pipes argued: "The merger of political and economic power implicit in socialism greatly strengthens the ability of the state and its bureaucracy to control the population. Theoretically, this capacity need not be exercised and need not lead to the growing domination of the population by the state. In practice, such a tendency is virtually inevitable. For one thing, the socialization of the economy must lead to a numerical growth of the bureaucracy required to administer it, and this process cannot fail to augment the power of the state. For another, socialism leads to a tug of war between the state, bent on enforcing its economic monopoly, and the ordinary citizen, equally determined to evade it; the result is repression and the creation of specialized repressive organs."

See also 
 New Democracy
 People's democracy (Marxism–Leninism)

References 

Democracy
Elections
Politics
Types of democracy
Types of socialism